"Some Kind of Lover" is the fourth single from Jody Watley's debut album Jody Watley.

History
"Some Kind of Lover" was Jody's third top 10 pop single from the album, and third number-one of the US dance chart, though the single found huge success in the US, outside the states, the single only reached number 81 on the UK charts.

The single advanced into the top 40 of the U.S. Billboard Hot 100 singles chart during the week of February 27, 1988, reaching number 10 the week of April 16, 1988.  "Some Kind of Lover" kept Watley in the Top 20 of the singles chart for six weeks. 

The music video premiered in January 1988 and was nominated for two MTV Video Music Awards, for Best Female Video and Best New Artist in a Video, she also performed "Some Kind of Lover" at the award show that year.

Awards and nominations

Charts

References

Jody Watley songs
1988 singles
Songs written by André Cymone
Songs written by Jody Watley
1987 songs
MCA Records singles